Sunday Best is a reality television series on Black Entertainment Television.

The first season was filmed in Los Angeles, California, and the winner was Crystal Aikin.

The Competition
During the second and third weeks of competition, the 20 finalists were divided into two groups of ten. All ten contestants in their respective groups performed one song, and five of the ten were eliminated the night of their performance.

Starting in Week 4 of the competition, the contestants complete performances in one week; however, the eliminated finalist(s) are not announced until the following episode.

The two contestants that will compete in the season's finale will be determined by the results of a vote by the at home viewers.

Approximately 1.5 Million Votes were cast in the final vote.

Jermaine Sellers was also a contestant on American Idol season 9. He made it to the top 24, but was eliminated in the second week of the semifinal rounds alongside John Park, Michelle Delamor, Haeley Vaughn.

The 20 Finalists Season 1
 Week 1 Episode showed highlights of the audition process.

Contestants songs

Episode guide

External links
 BET Shows - Sunday Best
 
 Jermaine Sellers American Idol audition

2007 American television seasons